Maleh Safarkhan Kheybar (also Romanized as Maleh S̱afarkhān  Kheybar) is a village in Dustan Rural District, Badreh District, Darreh Shahr County, Ilam Province, Iran. At the 2006 census, its population was 82, in 13 families. The village is populated by Kurds.

References 

Populated places in Darreh Shahr County
Kurdish settlements in Ilam Province